= Siddiqa Begum =

Pakistani literary personality (1925–2019)

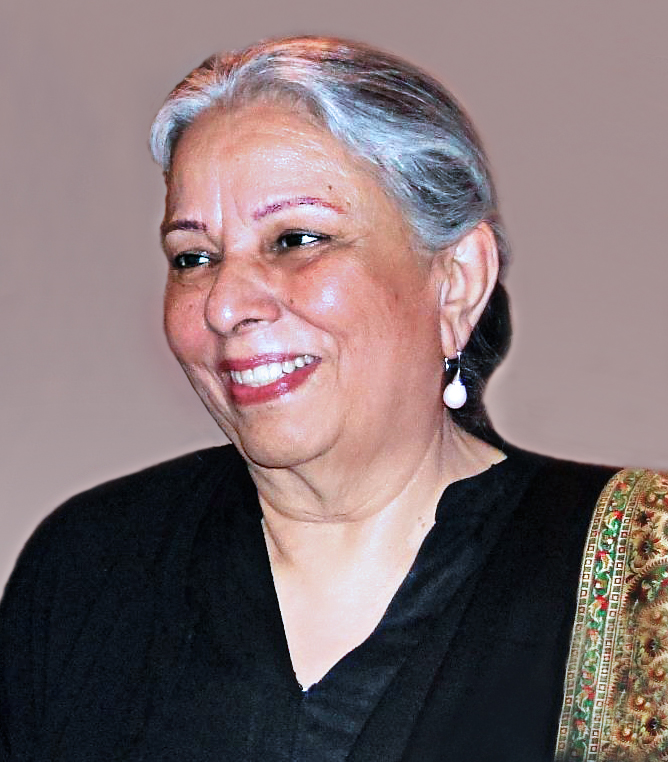
- Begum in 2012
- Born: Siddiqa Begum; 1925
- Died: 15 December 2019 (aged 93-94)
- Occupation: Editor of Adbe Latif

Siddiqa Begum (Urdu: صدیقہ بیگم) was a literary personality of the city of Lahore, Pakistan. She served as the editor of the Urdu magazine Adbe Latif since 1984.
